John McCrea (born June 25, 1964) is an American singer and musician. He is a founding member of the band Cake. He is the vocalist and primary lyricist for the band, in addition to playing acoustic guitar, vibraslap, and piano. He also programs drums and does mixing work while he and the rest of the band have produced all of their albums.

Biography
McCrea spent most of the 1980s playing in various bands or performing solo. His mid-1980s band John McCrea and the Roughousers recorded the songs "Love You Madly" and "Shadow Stabbing," which were later re-recorded by Cake (both featured on 2001's Comfort Eagle). This band included Michael Urbano (drums), Pete Costello (bass), and Robert Kuhlmann (guitar).

In the late 1980s, McCrea moved to Los Angeles and began playing acoustically in local coffee shops. His first solo release was a double-sided single on vinyl only called Rancho Seco. One side was electric and the other acoustic. The single was a protest song against the now-decommissioned nuclear power plant Rancho Seco built southeast of Sacramento.

McCrea moved back to Sacramento in 1991, forming Cake later that year.

Vocal style

McCrea's voice has a distinctive "rough-around-the-edges" quality, which is especially evident when he sings in the lower part of his vocal range. He is also known for half-singing, half-speaking lyrics in many of his songs, sometimes in a kind of energetic monotone, such as the hits "The Distance" and "Never There."  McCrea also commonly sings with off-beat rhythms and emphasizes the consonants in words instead of the vowels.  The single "Perhaps, Perhaps, Perhaps," is a good example of this.

Personal life

McCrea is a vocal activist for various causes, notably global warming, reforestation and world poverty. He frequently uses the band's website and concerts as a platform to increase awareness about these and other issues. He was a member of the board of directors of HeadCount, a non-profit organization that uses music to promote voter registration and participation. He is also a founder of the Content Creators Coalition, a group of musicians and creatives that advocates for the rights of artists.

Collaborations

He has collaborated with Ben Folds, singing on the track "Fred Jones, Part 2" from 2001's Rockin' the Suburbs and performing the song live with Folds and on Folds' 2002 album Ben Folds Live.

John McCrea contributed vocals to "The Headphonist," a track from Mexican rock band Kinky's 2003 Atlas album.

References 

1964 births
Living people
American alternative rock musicians
American male singer-songwriters
American rock singers
American rock songwriters
American rock guitarists
American male guitarists
Singer-songwriters from California
Cake (band) members
Guitarists from California
20th-century American guitarists